Brett Andrew Sutton (born ) is an Australian  public health doctor who has served as the Chief Health Officer of Victoria since March 2019. Sutton has been serving in this role during the COVID-19 pandemic and has become a public face of the response in Victoria to the pandemic.

In addition to his role as Chief Health Officer of Victoria, Sutton is currently Chief Human Biosecurity Officer for Victoria, a Fellow of the Royal Society for Public Health, a Fellow of the Australasian College of Tropical Medicine, a Fellow of the Australasian Faculty of Public Health Medicine (AFPHM) and is a member of the Faculty of Travel Medicine.

Life and career 
Brett Sutton grew up in Croydon, Melbourne. He attended Melbourne High School and then went on to complete the Bachelor of Medicine, Bachelor of Surgery medical degrees at the University of Melbourne, and graduated from James Cook University in 2008 with a Master of Public Health and Tropical Medicine. 

Following university, Sutton worked in emergency medicine, and has worked with a number of international emergency and field-based organisations including Médecins Sans Frontières, the International Rescue Committee in Kenya and Ethiopia, and John Snow International in Timor-Leste. During this time he was featured in several episodes of the reality television series Medical Emergency.

Sutton also worked in health in the developing world and performed field-based work in Afghanistan and East Timor.

Public health career 
Throughout the 2010s, Sutton served in public health roles relating to communicable disease at the Department of Health and Human Services of Victoria. In March 2019 he was appointed Chief Health Officer.

As Chief Health Officer during the COVID-19 pandemic, Sutton provides public health advice to the state government in response to the virus and has used emergency powers under the Public Health and Wellbeing Act 2008 to impose restrictions and lockdowns in Victoria. After the virus had re-entered the community through leaks in the hotel quarantine system, Melbourne faced the longest-lasting and strictest restrictions seen in Australia, with a 112-day lockdown imposed in Melbourne during the second half of 2020, and a night time curfew and 5km travel limit. These measures were ultimately successful, with restrictions being removed towards the end of 2020 as Victoria achieved elimination of the virus from the community.

Sutton gave evidence at an inquiry investigating the leak of the virus from hotel quarantine into the community. He said that it was "astounding" that he was excluded from the process to plan the hotel quarantine system and said he had no knowledge that private security were being used in the system until reading about it in the media in May 2020. The inquiry found that the leak into the community was caused by poorly trained private security guards and poor cleaning and training procedures, but was unable to determine who commissioned the use of private security.

Throughout the pandemic, Sutton has appeared regularly at press conferences with the premier and other ministers. As a result, he has become a public face of the Victorian Government response to the virus.

References

External links 
 Chief Health Officer official website

Living people
Australian health officials
Medical doctors from Melbourne
Australian medical doctors
20th-century Australian medical doctors
21st-century Australian medical doctors
21st-century Australian public servants
Melbourne Medical School alumni
Year of birth missing (living people)
People educated at Melbourne High School
People from Croydon, Victoria
James Cook University alumni
Public servants from Melbourne